James Cody Hiland (born 1972) is an American lawyer who served as the United States Attorney for the United States District Court for the Eastern District of Arkansas from 2017 to 2020.

Education
He graduated from the University of Central Arkansas in 1993 and from the William H. Bowen School of Law in 1998 with a Juris Doctor.

Legal career
Hiland was elected to serve as the prosecuting attorney for the 20th Judicial District of Arkansas in 2010 and was re-elected in 2014. 

Hiland served as a partner at Hiland, Thomas & Cox, PLLC; a staff attorney and rural and community liaison for the Arkansas Public Service Commission; program director for the Arkansas Transitional Employment Board; and legislative liaison and aide to Mike Huckabee. He was recommended for the position of U.S. Attorney by U.S. Senators John Boozman and Tom Cotton.

United States Attorney
In July 2017, he was nominated by President Donald Trump to become the U.S. Attorney for the Eastern District of Arkansas. He was confirmed by the United States Senate on September 28, 2017. He was sworn into office on October 10, 2017. He resigned on December 31, 2020.

See also
 United States Attorneys for the Eastern District of Arkansas

References

1970s births
Living people
University of Central Arkansas alumni
William H. Bowen School of Law alumni
Arkansas lawyers
21st-century American lawyers
United States Attorneys for the Eastern District of Arkansas